Erebus nyctaculis is a moth of the family Erebidae. It is found from Mindanao and Indonesia (including Java and Sulawesi) south to northern Australia.

References

External links
Australian Caterpillars

Moths described in 1880
Erebus (moth)